A satchel is a type of carrying bag.

Satchel may also refer to:

Satchel, an Australian pre-paid mail sack

People

Nickname
Satchel Davis (1918–2013), American baseball pitcher
Satchel Paige (1906–1982), American baseball pitcher
Louis Armstrong (1901–1971), American jazz trumpeter, composer and singer nicknamed "Satchmo" and "Satch" (short for Satchelmouth)
Russ Parrish (born 1970), known as Satchel, American guitarist for the band Steel Panther

Given name
Satchel Ronan O'Sullivan Farrow (born 1987), American journalist, son of Mia Farrow and Woody Allen
Satchel Lee (born 1994), daughter of Spike Lee, Golden Globe Ambassadress at the 78th Golden Globe Awards

Surname
Blanche Satchel (fl. 1920s–1930s), Australian dancer

Characters
Comrade Satchel, a spy codename from the film Atomic Blonde
Satchel Pooch, a fictional character in the comic strip Get Fuzzy
Andrey Satchel, a fictional character created by Thomas Hardy

Other uses
 Satchel (band), American rock band
 Satchel's Pizza, a restaurant in Gainesville, Florida, U.S.

See also

 Satchel charge, a demolition explosive in a bag
 
 
 Satchel-mouth (disambiguation)
 Satch (disambiguation)